Brassia allenii is a species of orchid. It is native to Honduras and Panama.

References

allenii
Orchids of Honduras
Orchids of Panama